Typhoon Mujigae, known in the Philippines as Tropical Storm Kabayan, was the costliest typhoon to impact China in 2015. The typhoon first passed over the Philippines as a developing tropical cyclone from October 1 to 3, 2015. It then caused widespread damage in the Chinese provinces of Guangdong, Guangxi, and Hainan from October 3 to 6. Afterwards, as Mujigae weakened inland, it brought heavy rain to parts of Mainland Southeast Asia. Mujigae originated from an area of disturbed weather that formed just east of the Philippines on September 30. The disturbance slowly organized amid a favorable environment, becoming a tropical depression later that day. It traveled steadily west-northwestwards and made landfall in Central Luzon late on October 1, before crossing into the South China Sea the next morning. The typhoon then made landfall over Zhanjiang, Guangdong, and weakened swiftly, dissipating inland over Guangxi on October 5.

As a developing system, Mujigae brought gusty winds, moderate rain, and rough seas to the island of Luzon in the Philippines. The adverse weather forced ports and schools to close, while numerous landslides and flash floods damaged roads, houses, and agricultural land. Large waves caused by the storm capsized several fishing boats, necessitating search-and-rescue operations by the Philippine Navy and Coast Guard. In total, Mujigae killed at least four in the Philippines, left 12 missing, and caused damage valued at ₱46.9 million (US$ million).

Mujigae's most severe impacts occurred in China, with the provinces of Guangdong, Guangxi, and Hainan being the worst hit. The typhoon affected 7.5 million people across the three provinces, causing 27 fatalities and economic losses of ¥27 billion (US$ billion). The outer bands of the typhoon spawned destructive tornadoes in Guangzhou and Foshan that killed seven and left 223 injured. Infrastructural damage left by the tornadoes resulted in widespread disruptions to telecommunications, electricity, and water supplies. Elsewhere, fallen trees, landslides, and collapsing buildings accounted for most of the fatalities. In preparation for the storm, ships and offshore workers were recalled to port, flights were delayed or canceled, train services were suspended, and tourist attractions were shut. These disrupted tourism amid China's "Golden Week" holidays following their National Day. Hong Kong and Macau experienced gusty winds and heavy rain from October 3 to 5 as Mujigae passed to the south, but were left relatively unscathed. Immediate post-storm relief was provided by the National Disaster Reduction Center of China and the Ministry of Civil Affairs. The National Development and Reform Commission later issued more funds for reconstruction efforts in Guangdong and Guangxi.

Towards the end of Mujigae's lifespan, its outer rainbands brought heavy rains to parts of Vietnam, Cambodia, Laos, and Thailand, causing localized flash floods. Consequently, some homes and crops were damaged.

Meteorological history

The Joint Typhoon Warning Center (JTWC) deemed the disturbance to have become a tropical depression at 12:00 UTC and gave it the identifier 22W. The Japan Meteorological Agency (JMA) also classified the system as a tropical depression at 18:00 UTC. The depression was lopsided at this time, with the bulk of thunderstorm activity to the west of the system's center. Amid low vertical wind shear and good outflow helping the growth of thunderstorms, the depression improved further in organization through October 1, as it moved west-northwestwards under the influence of a subtropical ridge to its north. The Philippine Atmospheric, Geophysical and Astronomical Services Administration named the system Kabayan at 02:00 UTC on October 1. The JTWC, however, continued to classify the system as a tropical depression as it approached the Philippines. No further intensification occurred on October 1 as Mujigae's circulation interacted with the Sierra Madre mountain range. Mujigae made landfall between Baler and San Luis in Aurora Province, Central Luzon, at roughly 20:00 UTC, and quickly crossed the island of Luzon, entering the South China Sea by 02:00 UTC on October 2.

Once over water, Mujigae soon resumed intensifying, taking advantage of  sea surface temperatures and strong outflow despite slightly elevated wind shear. The JTWC finally assessed Mujigae to be a tropical storm at 06:00 UTC on October 2; the JMA upgraded Mujigae further to severe tropical storm status six hours later. A nascent eye feature became visible on microwave satellite imagery, while associated thunderstorms grew more intense and wrapped more tightly into the system's circulation. Meanwhile, Mujigae continued tracking steadily west-northwest and exited the Philippine Area of Responsibility late on October 2. A 30-hour period of rapid intensification began at 00:00 UTC on October 3, aided greatly by the anomalously warm waters of the South China Sea, which even exceeded  around Hainan. Monthly mean sea surface temperatures in the area were the warmest since 1990, giving Mujigae ample energy to draw upon for strengthening in spite of moderate easterly wind shear. During this strengthening phase, the China Meteorological Administration's Shanghai Typhoon Institute launched four rocket-carried dropsondes into Mujigae from Wanning, Hainan, in a successful attempt to analyse the typhoon's interior structure. Shortly after, Mujigae made landfall in Potou District, Zhanjiang, Guangdong province, at 06:10 UTC on October 4. Rapid weakening commenced as the center of circulation moved over land, staying north of the Gulf of Tonkin. Mujigae weakened to a tropical storm by 18:00 UTC on October 4 and the JMA ceased monitoring the system as a tropical depression at 00:00 UTC on October 5. The JTWC continued tracking Mujigae while it moved inland over Guangxi province and last noted it as a dissipating tropical storm at 06:00 UTC on October 5.

Effects in the Philippines

Public Storm Warning Signal No. 1 was raised in the provinces of Catanduanes, Camarines Sur, Camarines Norte, Aurora, and Northern Quezon on October 1, and further extended to Benguet, Tarlac, Ilocos Sur, and Zambales on October 2. Public Storm Warning Signal No. 2—the highest warning level issued for Mujigae—was raised in La Union and Pangasinan on October 2. All warnings were lifted by the evening of October 2 as Mujigae began to move away from the Philippines.

The tropical storm affected roughly 59,600 people during its passage over the Philippines. A peak 24-hour rainfall total of  occurred in Iba, Zambales. In Central Luzon, a total of 703 houses were damaged, of which 97 were destroyed. A landslide in Gabaldon, Nueva Ecija required the evacuation of 30 families, while another landslide in Buenavista, Marinduque damaged a wall. A person in Maria Aurora municipality drowned in a flash flood, while another from Bongabon municipality was killed by a snake bite. The body of a fisherman was found in Agno municipality on October 3, two days after he went fishing out at sea and was reported missing. In total, roughly 6,480 people evacuated to seven shelters. Classes were suspended across much of Luzon on October 2. Ports were closed in the Bicol Region and Southern Tagalog on October 2 and 3 because of rough seas, leaving up to 212 passengers and 53 rolling cargoes stranded. Twelve roads and two bridges were blocked by flooding and mudslides. Power outages occurred on October 2 and 3 in parts of Aurora, Benguet, and Pangasinan, including in Baguio, though services were quickly restored. Damage to agriculture and infrastructure in Ilocos and Central Luzon was valued at ₱46.9 million (US$ million), mostly from the provinces of Aurora, Pampanga, and Pangasinan. Following the storm, local government units and the Department of Social Welfare and Development gave ₱2.37 million (US$) worth of disaster relief to Aurora, Bulacan, and Nueva Ecija provinces.

Numerous incidents occurred at sea as fishermen continued operations despite being advised against doing so by government agencies and the Philippine Coast Guard. Several fishing boats were capsized by large waves, leaving fishermen adrift in the water for up to four days before they were picked up by other boats or were swept back to shore. As many as 121 fishermen were missing on the night of October 3. The Philippine Navy activated two Islander aircraft and several ships to conduct search and rescue operations, in conjunction with vessels from the Coast Guard. They were largely successful in locating the missing fishermen, with the number of missing decreasing to 56 by October 5. A "partial and unofficial report" from the Coast Guard on October 6 stated that three fishermen had been confirmed dead; a body of another fisherman was recovered from the waters off Pangasinan on October 7. The searches were called off between October 7 and 10, leaving 12 still missing.

Effects in mainland China
Typhoon Mujigae brought severe impacts to the provinces of Guangdong, Guangxi, and Hainan from October 3 to 6, affecting over 7.5 million people and killing 27. With economic losses estimated at ¥27 billion (US$ billion), Mujigae was the costliest typhoon to impact China in 2015. The three provinces experienced strong winds of at least , with a peak gust of  recorded in Zhanjiang. The outer rainbands of Mujigae also produced tornadoes in parts of Guangdong on October 4. Power outages occurred in much of the region and transport lines were cut. Mujigae came ashore during a week-long holiday (known as a "Golden Week") following China's National Day, disrupting the plans of many tourists seeking to travel to the southern coast. Mujigae's track and rapid intensification prior to landfall drew comparisons to Typhoon Rammasun, which had significantly impacted similar areas a year earlier.

Guangdong
The Qiongzhou Strait was closed to marine traffic on the evening of October 2, and nearly 40,000 fishing boats west of Shanwei returned to port to shelter in Guangdong. Coastal tourist attractions in the province were closed from October 3. The suspension of ferry services to offshore islands left 503 tourists on Fangji Island stranded; strong winds hampered attempts to return them to the mainland. The National Marine Environmental Forecasting Center issued warnings for storm surge and large waves that same day. Flights out of Zhuhai and Zhanjiang were canceled. China Southern Power Grid readied 24,000 workers to address any power disruptions. Authorities evacuated 170,400 people in vulnerable areas.

Mujigae made landfall in Potou District, Zhanjiang, on the afternoon of October 4. The typhoon brought high winds and heavy rain to over 3.53 million people in Guangdong, and spawned at least three tornadoes in the province. One tornado touched down in Guangzhou's Panyu District, killing three and injuring 134. The tornado damaged several houses and factories, blew down trees, and damaged power cables. Large parts of Panyu and Haizhu Districts thus lost power for the first time in 23 years. Tourists visiting the Canton Tower in Haizhu had to be evacuated after it suffered a blackout. The power outages had a further knock-on effect on communications and water infrastructure, resulting in greater disruption. Another tornado touched down in Shunde District, Foshan, causing four deaths and 89 injuries, while inflicting roughly ¥180 million (US$29 million) of damage. It was also noted to have possessed twin funnels at peak intensity. The Foshan tornado was rated EF3 on the Enhanced Fujita scale, based on observations of collapsed tower cranes and destroyed factories and warehouses. A third tornado—this time a waterspout—occurred near the coast of Shanwei. For context, tornadoes in China are rather uncommon: on average less than 100 occur in a year, and in the 50 years prior to 2015, only 20 were at or above EF3 intensity. Hence, when Mujigae struck China in 2015, the country had no tornado forecasting or warning systems, likely contributing to an elevated number of fatalities and more extensive damage.

Damage was most severe in Zhanjiang, the site of Mujigae's landfall. The city experienced widespread blackouts and disruptions to water supplies and telecommunications, which hampered damage assessments. The waters of Zhanjiang Bay experienced an atypical period of elevated biodegradation of organic matter, following increased surface runoff entering the bay; this usually causes algal blooms instead. The storm sank two fishing boats docked in the city's port, drowning three and leaving four missing. A collapsed building in Xiashan District killed another. Elsewhere, landslides killed a total of seven people: four in Xinyi, Maoming, two in Luoding, Yunfu, and one in Guangning County, Zhaoqing. Overall, in Guangdong, Mujigae killed at least 18 people and left four missing. Direct economic losses reached ¥23.24 billion (US$ billion).

Guangxi

As Mujigae was expected to pass over eastern Guangxi, warnings for heavy rain and gusty winds were issued, and an increased possibility of landslides was noted. About 12,700 fishing boats in the region's waters were called back to port and 35,400 offshore workers were evacuated. Nineteen flights from Beihai Fucheng Airport were canceled as adverse weather conditions forced the airport to close on October 4. Meanwhile, 530 passengers were stranded at Nanning Wuxu International Airport as two flights were delayed by more than five hours and two others were scrapped. Services along the Guangxi coastal high-speed railway between Nanning and Beihai were halted from noon on October 4 to midnight on October 5. Scenic attractions were closed beginning October 4 and tourists evacuated. About 135,100 people living in vulnerable areas were moved to safety.

The center of Mujigae crossed into Guangxi from Guangdong on the evening of October 4, though heavy rains and gusty winds persisted in Guangxi through October 4 and 5. The typhoon affected 2.67 million people in the province. Numerous flash floods and landslides occurred in the mountains of southeast Guangxi, damaging roads and buildings. A person was crushed and killed by a fallen tree in Nanning; the typhoon killed a total of two people in the province. Damage to power lines caused 1.155 million residents of Guangxi to lose power on October 5. The typhoon completely destroyed 954 houses, severely damaged another 1,532 houses, and left 5,478 more with mild damage. Direct economic losses were at least ¥919 million (US$ million), of which ¥752 million (US$ million) was from agriculture and ¥46.8 million (US$ million) was from property damage.

Hainan
Ahead of the storm, train services between the island and the mainland were suspended from October 2 to 5, while services on the Hainan eastern ring high-speed railway were halted on October 4. The Qiongzhou Strait was closed to marine traffic and ferry services across the strait were suspended. All 25,584 fishing boats in Hainan were ordered back to port to take shelter. Seventy-six flights from Haikou Meilan International Airport were delayed and eight canceled. Expressways remained open to vehicular traffic, however. Residents in flood-prone areas, such as Beigang Island, were evacuated to higher ground. By the evening of October 3, a total of 39,103 people in Wenchang had been resettled in 57 shelters, while 9,887 people had been evacuated in Qionghai. Hainan Power Grid placed 272 teams (with a total of 4,559 workers) and equipment worth ¥160 million (US$ million) on standby to deal with disruptions to electrical services. Marine tourist attractions in Sanya, such as Wuzhizhou Island and parts of Yalong Bay, were shut beginning October 3, and all tourist attractions in Wenchang were closed from that evening.

Roughly  of rain fell over the island from October 3 to 4. The typhoon affected 489,000 people in Hainan and caused economic losses of over ¥136 million (US$ million), though no deaths were reported. About  of cropland were damaged, contributing to over half of the province's damage bill. The remaining losses came from transport and industry as well as damage to water conservancy facilities. Power supplies remained relatively stable: about 47,000 customers lost power, and services were restored to 41,000 of them by the end of October 4. Flooding occurred along several streets in Haikou, however, storm surge did not enter the city and traffic was mostly unaffected. Reopening began on October 4 as the typhoon passed, with closures imposed on Sanya's tourist attractions lifted on the evening of October 4. Flights from Haikou Meilan International Airport resumed on the afternoon of October 4. All train services resumed on the morning of October 5.

Effects elsewhere

The influence of Mujigae and a high-pressure area to the north brought squalls and rain to Hong Kong from October 3 to 5 as Mujigae passed to the south of the territory. Strong Wind Signal No. 3 was issued from October 3 to 4, and Amber Rainstorm Warning Signals were raised twice on the two days. The weather conditions caused 39 aircraft to be diverted from Hong Kong International Airport, and disrupted ferry services to and from Macau. At least 30 incidents of fallen trees and 14 incidents of flooding were recorded, with a fallen tree near Fanling station halting train services by damaging overhead cables. A runner participating in a race between Lantau and Sunset Peaks suffered a broken arm when he slipped off the track amid the adverse weather conditions. The final round of the Asia-Pacific Amateur Championship ended prematurely due to thunderstorms on the morning of October 4.

Nearby Macau experienced a similar situation from October 3 to 5. Typhoon Signal No. 3 was raised from the evening of October 3 to the morning on October 5 as heavy rains and gusty winds buffeted the territory. Some flooding occurred in low-lying regions. The Fire Services Bureau received 27 reports of fallen trees; in total they responded to 59 typhoon-related incidents. Thunderstorms forced the cancellation of six outdoor events and delayed at least 15 flights from Macau International Airport. Ferry operator TurboJET suspended services from Macau to Shenzhen and Hong Kong. A woman at the University of Macau suffered cuts on her limbs from broken glass and was sent to hospital. The adverse weather caused Macau's tourist visitation numbers to drop by 16 percent in the week following the typhoon, erasing gains from China's Golden Week holidays.

As Mujigae weakened inland over China, it brought torrential rain to parts of Vietnam, Thailand, Cambodia, and Laos. Meanwhile, heavy rains in Northeast and Central Thailand had the beneficial effect of filling reservoirs, but caused several flash floods on October 4 and 5. One such flood in Nakhon Sawan Province ruined  of cropland, while another in Chachoengsao Province inundated 40 houses, causing damage to agricultural equipment and electrical appliances. In Ratchaburi Province, a crocodile farm was flooded, and some of the crocodiles escaped. Other provinces affected by flash floods included Chanthaburi and Kamphaeng Phet.

Aftermath
Following Mujigae's landfall in Guangdong, the National Disaster Reduction Center of China and the Ministry of Civil Affairs launched a Level IV emergency response in Guangdong and Guangxi. Guangdong's local government allocated ¥20 million (US$ million) of funds to immediate disaster relief, and distributed ¥900,000 (US$) worth of relief supplies in Yanjiang and Maoming by October 5. The next day, Guangdong authorities moved 300 tents, 300 folding beds, 2,100 quilts, 4,100 towels, 3,500 sets of clothing, and 250 emergency lights to affected cities. Guangxi's local government invested ¥18 million (US$ million) into disaster relief by October 5, with plans to set aside a further ¥29 million (US$ million). Around 24,800 workers from China Southern Power Grid were dispatched to restore electrical services, and by the morning of October 6 about 78 percent of households had their power restored. Outages in Hainan and Guangxi were fully resolved on October 5 and 7, respectively.

On October 27, the Chinese government announced that ¥300 million (US$ million) of funds would be set aside for disaster relief efforts in Guangdong and Guangxi in addition to drought-stricken North China. This would cover reconstruction efforts and living expenses for those affected by Mujigae in the two provinces. A further contribution of ¥103 million (US$ million) was announced by the National Development and Reform Commission on November 5.

Retirement

At the 48th Session of the ESCAP/WMO Typhoon Committee held from February 22 to 25, 2016, the name Mujigae was retired following a request by China due to the high damage and death toll caused by the storm. In 2017, the name Surigae was chosen as a replacement.

See also

List of tornadoes spawned by tropical cyclones
Typhoon Vera (1983) – took a similar track across the Philippines and into South China
Typhoon Krovanh (2003) – impacted similar parts of China
Typhoon Prapiroon (2006) – a less strong but similarly damaging typhoon that affected nearly the same areas; also spawned a tornado in Foshan
Typhoon Utor (2013) – strong typhoon that impacted similar parts of the Philippines and China
Typhoon Rammasun (2014) – extremely damaging and powerful typhoon that similarly rapidly intensified before landfall in northeast Hainan

Notes

References

External links

JMA General Information of Typhoon Mujigae (1522) from Digital Typhoon
JMA Best Track Data of Typhoon Mujigae (1522) 

22W.MUJIGAE from the U.S. Naval Research Laboratory

2015 disasters in China
Mujigae
Mujigae
Mujigae
Mujigae
Mujigae
Mujigae
Mujigae
Mujigae